Zilch is the fourth studio album by Filipino alternative rock band Pupil, released on March 6, 2015. It is the band's first album released through MCA Music and their first one to feature guitarist Jerome Velasco.

Accolades
The music videos for "Out of Control" and "Why" were nominated for Favorite Rock Video at the Myx Music Awards 2015 and 2016 respectively.

Track listing

References

2015 albums
Pupil (band) albums